Nexus is the weekly free students' magazine of the Waikato Students Union at the University of Waikato, New Zealand.

History and profile
Nexus was established in 1967 and now has an advertised circulation of 2000 weekly. It is published throughout the academic year in the form of a full colour magazine and is also made available on the Waikato Students Union website.

In the late 1990s the magazine faced troubled times, caused mainly by the student union membership being made voluntary.

Controversy
In 1967, Nexus was sued after printing allegations against a professor at the University of Waikato. In court, the case was described as "the worst defamation [case] in New Zealand history" at the time. Nexus lost the case, and the defendant was awarded $30,000.

In 2003, an advertisement in the magazine, titled "Nexus, Funnier than Porn", drew several complaints.

References

External links
 The Nexus magazine's website
 The Waikato students' Union's website

Free magazines
Magazines with year of establishment missing
Mass media in Hamilton, New Zealand
Magazines published in New Zealand
Weekly magazines published in New Zealand
Student magazines
Student newspapers published in New Zealand
University of Waikato